Gostun Point (‘Nos Gostun’ \'nos go-'stun\) is the ice-free point on the north coast of Snow Island in the South Shetland Islands, Antarctica situated 2.4 km west-northwest of Karposh Point, and 2.45 km east-southeast of Cape Timblón.

The point is named after the Bulgar ruler Khan Gostun, predecessor of the creator of Old Great Bulgaria Khan Kubrat (7th Century AD).

Location
British mapping in 1968, Bulgarian in 2009.

Map
 L.L. Ivanov. Antarctica: Livingston Island and Greenwich, Robert, Snow and Smith Islands. Scale 1:120000 topographic map.  Troyan: Manfred Wörner Foundation, 2009.

References
 Gostun Point. SCAR Composite Gazetteer of Antarctica.
 Bulgarian Antarctic Gazetteer. Antarctic Place-names Commission. (details in Bulgarian, basic data in English)

External links
 Gostun Point. Copernix satellite image

Headlands of the South Shetland Islands
Bulgaria and the Antarctic